is a Japanese cross-country skier and biathlete.

She competes in paralympic skiing in category LW6. Her left arm has nerve damage from her birth.

In the 2014 Winter Paralympics at Sochi she competed in the 6km standing biathlon, ranking 13th, and in standing cross-country skiing at distances of 1km sprint freestyle, 5km freestyle and 15km freestyle events, ranking 10th, 9th and 8th respectively.

She also competed in the 2018 Winter Paralympics at Pyeongchang.

References

External links

1995 births
Living people
Biathletes at the 2014 Winter Paralympics
Cross-country skiers at the 2014 Winter Paralympics
Cross-country skiers at the 2018 Winter Paralympics
Paralympic biathletes of Japan
Paralympic cross-country skiers of Japan
Japanese female cross-country skiers
Japanese female biathletes
21st-century Japanese women